There are over 9,000 Grade I listed buildings in England. This page is a list of these buildings in the district of South Hams in Devon.

South Hams

|}

Notes

External links

Lists of Grade I listed buildings in Devon
Grade I listed buildings in Devon
South Hams